The Red Man and the Child is a 1908 American black-and-white short silent Western film directed by D. W. Griffith for the American Mutoscope & Biograph Company. It stars Charles Inslee and six-year old John Tansey.

Cast
 Charles Inslee as The Sioux
 John Tansey as Child (as Johnny Tansey)
 Linda Arvidson as Woman
 George Gebhardt as Villain
 Harry Solter as Villain

See also
 D. W. Griffith filmography
 List of American films of 1908

References

External links
 

1908 films
1908 Western (genre) films
American black-and-white films
American silent short films
Films directed by D. W. Griffith
Films shot in New Jersey
Silent American Western (genre) films
1900s American films